Isophthalic acid is an organic compound with the formula C6H4(CO2H)2.  This colorless solid is an isomer of phthalic acid and terephthalic acid.  The main industrial uses of purified isophthalic acid (PIA) are for the production of polyethylene terephthalate  (PET) resin and for the production of unsaturated polyester resin (UPR) and other types of coating resins.

Isophthalic acid is one of three isomers of benzenedicarboxylic acid, the others being phthalic acid and terephthalic acid.

Preparation
Isophthalic acid is produced on the billion kilogram per year scale by oxidizing meta-xylene using oxygen.  The process employs a cobalt-manganese catalyst.  The world's largest producer of isophthalic acid is Lotte Chemical Corporation. 

In the laboratory, chromic acid can be used as the oxidant. It also arises by fusing potassium meta-sulfobenzoate, or meta-bromobenzoate with potassium formate (terephthalic acid is also formed in the last case).

The barium salt, as its hexahydrate, is very soluble in water (a distinction between phthalic and terephthalic acids). Uvitic acid, 5-methylisophthalic acid, is obtained by oxidizing mesitylene or by condensing pyroracemic acid with baryta water.

Applications
Aromatic dicarboxylic acids are used as precursors (in form of acyl chlorides) to commercially important polymers, e.g. the fire-resistant material Nomex. Mixed with terephthalic acid, isophthalic acid is used in the production of PET resins for drink plastic bottles and food packaging.  The high-performance polymer polybenzimidazole is produced from isophthalic acid. Also, the acid is used as an important input to produce insulation materials.

References

Note: reference 2 refers to the ortho isomer. Accurate cites for the meta isomer not available.

External links
International Chemical Safety Card 0500

Dicarboxylic acids
Monomers
Benzoic acids